Nephilingis is a genus of spiders in the family Araneidae. It was split off from the genus Nephilengys in 2006. Both genera have been called hermit spiders from the habit of staying in their retreats during the day; alternatively the name "hermit spider" may be reserved for Nephilingis, with Nephilengys species called "eunuch spiders".

Description
The epigynum is wider than long, without a central septum or anterior rim – distinguishing them from females of Nephilengys. Males are considerably smaller. The conductor of the palpal bulb is short, wide and spiraled. Species of Nephilingis, like those of  Nephilengys, build large asymmetric webs on trees with a hiding retreat in which they hide during the day. The webs make use of branches and similar supports but are mainly aerial, contrasting with those of other nephiline species, whose webs follow the contours of the tree trunk.

Taxonomy
The genus Nephilingis was erected by Matjaž Kuntner in 2013. In 1872,  Ludwig Koch created the genus Nephilengys. In 2013, based on phylogenetic studies, Kuntner and co-workers split Nephilengys into two genera. Four species were moved to the newly erected genus Nephilingis, with two species being left in Nephilengys. Nephilingis is differentiated from Nephilengys by the shapes of the female epigynum and the male palpal bulb.

Koch placed the original genus Nephilengys in the family Araneidae. In 1894, Eugène Simon erected the subfamily Nephilinae within the Araneidae for Nephila and related genera, including Nephilengys. This classification was used until the late 20th century, when cladistic studies initially suggested that nephilines belonged in the Tetragnathidae, although this was later refuted. When Kuntner split Nephilengys in 2006, he raised the nephilines from a subfamily to the family Nephilidae. Molecular phylogenetic studies from 2004 onwards consistently placed nephilids within Araneidae. Accordingly in 2016, Dimitar Dimitrov et al. returned them to their traditional position as a subfamily of Araneidae.

Species
, the World Spider Catalog accepted the following species:
Nephilingis borbonica (Vinson, 1863) – Réunion
Nephilingis cruentata (Fabricius, 1775) – Tropical Africa, South America
Nephilingis dodo (Kuntner & Agnarsson, 2011) – Mauritius
Nephilingis livida (Vinson, 1863) – Madagascar, Comoro Islands, Mayotte, Aldabra, Seychelles

Distribution
Nephilingis is primarily a tropical African species, including islands off mainland Africa in the western Indian Ocean. The dispersal of Nephilingis cruentata to South America is believed to be relatively recent.

References

Araneidae
Araneomorphae genera
Spiders of Africa
Spiders of South America